Schedule 7 may refer to:

 Schedule 7, of the UK Terrorism Act 2000
 Schedule 7, of the Drug prohibition law
 Schedule 7, of the Standard for the Uniform Scheduling of Drugs and Poisons

See also
 Schedule (disambiguation)